This is a list of events in British radio during 1977.

Events

January
3 January – At 6.45am, BBC Radio Cymru launches, and becomes the first broadcasting outlet dedicated wholly to programmes in Welsh. The service is part-time and restricted to breakfast shows, extended news bulletins at breakfast, lunchtime & early evening and a number of off-peak opt-outs from a sustaining Radio 4 Wales English-language feed.

February
14 February – The Annan Committee makes its recommendations and its principle recommendation for radio is for the privatisation of BBC local radio; this is not implemented.

March
No events.

April
30 April – The first edition of Sport on Four is broadcast on BBC Radio 4.

May
2 May – BBC Radio 4 launches a new breakfast programme Up to the Hour. Consequently, The Today Programme is reduced from a continuous two-hour programme to two 25-minute slots.

June
No events.

July
No events.

August
22 August – The BBC Radio comedy The Men from the Ministry airs its final episode after fifteen years on air.

September
No events.

October
2 October – The first edition of financial advice magazine programme Money Box is broadcast on BBC Radio 4.

November
28 November – BBC Radio 1 launches a weekday afternoon programme presented by Tony Blackburn. Previously, the station has simulcasted BBC Radio 2's afternoon show. Tony is replaced on mid-mornings by Simon Bates. Consequently Radio 1 now has its own all-day schedule on weekdays although the station continues to simulcast Radio 2 each night from 7pm, apart from the weekday late night John Peel programme.

December
No events.

Station debuts
3 January – BBC Radio Cymru
9 May – BBC Radio Orkney, BBC Radio Shetland

Programme debuts
 2 May – Up to the Hour on BBC Radio 4 (1977–1978)
 6 September – The News Quiz on BBC Radio 4 (1977–Present)
 2 October – Money Box on BBC Radio 4 (1977–Present)
 26 October – File on 4 on BBC Radio 4 (1977–Present)
 5 November – Albert and Me on BBC Radio 2 (1977–1983)
 The Enchanting World of Hinge and Bracket on BBC Radio 4 (1977–1979)

Continuing radio programmes

1940s
 Sunday Half Hour (1940–2018)
 Desert Island Discs (1942–Present)
 Down Your Way (1946–1992)
 Letter from America (1946–2004)
 Woman's Hour (1946–Present)
 A Book at Bedtime (1949–Present)

1950s
 The Archers (1950–Present)
 The Today Programme (1957–Present)
 Sing Something Simple (1959–2001)
 Your Hundred Best Tunes (1959–2007)

1960s
 Farming Today (1960–Present)
 In Touch (1961–Present)
 Petticoat Line (1965–1979)
 The World at One (1965–Present)
 The Official Chart (1967–Present)
 Just a Minute (1967–Present)
 The Living World (1968–Present)
 The Organist Entertains (1969–2018)

1970s
 PM (1970–Present)
 Start the Week (1970–Present)
 Week Ending (1970–1998)
 You and Yours (1970–Present)
 I'm Sorry I Haven't a Clue (1972–Present)
 Good Morning Scotland (1973–Present)
 Hello Cheeky (1973–1979)
 Kaleidoscope (1973–1998)
 Newsbeat (1973–Present)
 The News Huddlines (1975–2001)
 The Burkiss Way (1976–1980)

Ending this year
 16 July – The Navy Lark (1959–1977)
 22 August – The Men from the Ministry (1962–1977)

Births
31 May – Joel Ross, radio and television presenter
22 August – Sarah Champion, radio and television presenter
28 September – John Finnemore, comedy writer-performer
25 October – Anita Rani, radio and television presenter

Deaths
8 November – Ted Ray, comedian (born 1905)

See also 
 1977 in British music
 1977 in British television
 1977 in the United Kingdom
 List of British films of 1977

References

Radio
British Radio, 1977 In
Years in British radio